Zakarpattia Oblast ( and) is an oblast in western Ukraine, mostly coterminous with the historical region of Carpathian Ruthenia. Its administrative centre is the city of Uzhhorod, Other major cities within the oblast include Mukachevo, Khust, Berehove, and Chop, the last of which is home to railroad transport infrastructure.

Zakarpattia Oblast was established on 22 January 1946, after Czechoslovakia gave up its claim to the territory of Subcarpathian Ruthenia under a treaty between Czechoslovakia and the Soviet Union.  The territory of Subcarpathian Ruthenia was then taken over by the Soviet Union and became part of the Ukrainian Soviet Socialist Republic. 

Some scholars say that during the Ukrainian independence referendum held in 1991, Zakarpatska Oblast voters were given a separate option on whether or not they favoured autonomy for the region. Although a large majority favoured autonomy, it was not granted. However, this referendum was about self-government status, not about autonomy (like in Crimea).

Situated in the Carpathian Mountains of western Ukraine, except the southwestern Hungarian-populated region that belongs to the Hungarian plain, Zakarpattia Oblast is the only Ukrainian administrative division which borders upon four countries: Poland, Slovakia, Hungary, and Romania. The Carpathians are an important tourist and travel destination housing many ski and spa resorts, meaning that they play a major part in the oblast's economy.

With a land area of almost , the oblast is ranked 23rd by area and 15th by population as according to the 2001 Ukrainian Census, the population of Zakarpatska Oblast was 1,254,614. The current population is  This total includes people of many different nationalities of which Hungarians, Romanians, and Rusyns constitute significant minorities in some of the province's cities, while in others, they form the majority of the population (as in the case of Berehove).

Name
The oblast is also referred to as the Transcarpathian Oblast, Transcarpathia, Zakarpattia, or historically as Subcarpathian Rus'. In other languages the oblast is named:
 or translit. from the official Ukrainian Kárpátontúli terület


Ukrainian and Rusyn: Закарпатська область 

While the name Transcarpathia is a translation of the Ukrainian version of the name, the Hungarian name translates as Subcarpathia, following the Hungarian language logic "feet of the mountains", naming a territory after its geographic location at the lower section of a mountain range. (Following the same language pattern that applies to the name of the sub-Alpian territory in Western Hungary, Alpokalja)
Generally, the Transcarpathia name and its versions reflect the East Slavic language logic, while some Western languages follow the same logic as the Hungarian:
 

Other Western languages follow their own logic in creating a name for the region:

The coat of arms of Zakarpattia was originally created in the end of the 1920’s in the then Czechoslovakia.

Geography

The rest of the region is covered by the Transcarpathian Lowland which is part of the Pannonian plain. Zakarpattia is the only Ukrainian oblast to have boundaries with four countries: Poland, Slovakia, Hungary and Romania. On the West it borders the Prešov and Košice Regions of Slovakia and Borsod-Abaúj-Zemplén and Szabolcs-Szatmár-Bereg Counties of Hungary, on the South—the Satu Mare and Maramureș Counties of Romania, on the East and Northeast—Ivano-Frankivsk Oblast, and on the North—Lviv Oblast and the Subcarpathian Voivodeship of Poland.

The Zakarpattia Oblast mostly consists of mountains and small hills covered with deciduous and coniferous forests, as well as alpine meadows. Mountains cover about 80% of the oblast's area, and cross from North-West to South-East. The Primeval Beech Forests of the Carpathians, part of which are located within Zakarpattia Oblast, were recognized as a UNESCO World Heritage Site in 2007.

The largest rivers that flow through the oblast include the Tysa, Borzhava, and the Tereblia. A high altitude lake is located in Rakhiv Raion, which is the highest in the region. It is called Nesamovyte. The lake is located in the Hoverla preserve on the slopes of Turkul mountain.

The average temperature in summer is +21 °С (70 °F) and −4 °С (25 °F) in winter.

Four of the oblast's historical-cultural sites were nominated for the Seven Wonders of Ukraine competition in 2007: Palanok Castle, Museum upon the Chorna River, Mykhailiv Orthodox Church, and the Nevytsky Castle.

History

According to the Chronicon Pictum, the earliest state established in Zakarpattia was Ungvari in 677 AD. The name Ungvar derives from a migration of the Onogurs of Poltava who were ruled by the northern Kubiar sons of Kubrat. The Onogur tribes entered Etelköz through the Verecke Pass. Some of Ungvari's Kubiars under Khan-Tuvan eventually joined the Rus' to form Rus' Khaganate. In the late 9th century Ungvari's ruling Árpád dynasty began to fulfil their ambitions for the Carpathian basin where by 895 they had relocated to rule over the Magyars.

According to the Gesta Hungarorum, as Prince Álmos entered on the castle of Hung and there he appointed his son Árpád as the primary ruler, hence he was called of the leader of Hungvária, while all of his valiant soldiers as Hungvárus, so since then all the Magyars have been known by this name internationally.

In 895 the Hungarian tribes entered the Carpathian Basin from here through the Verecke pass, and the lands of Transcarpathia were part of the Principality of Hungary since 895, which transformed the Kingdom of Hungary in 1000. 

Since 1867, it was part of Hungarian side of Austria-Hungary until the latter's demise at the end of World War I. It approximately consisted of four Hungarian counties (comitatus): Bereg, Ung, Ugocsa and Maramaros. This region was briefly part of the short-lived West Ukrainian National Republic in 1918. The region was occupied by Romania by the end of that year, mostly the eastern portion such as Rakhiv and Khust. It was later recaptured by Hungarian Soviet Republic in the summer of 1919. Finally, after the Treaty of Trianon of 1920 it became part of Czechoslovakia with a supposedly equal level of autonomy as the Slovak lands and Bohemia-Moravia-Czech Silesia (Czech lands). 
The province has a unique footnote in history as the only region in the former Czechoslovakia to have had an American governor: its first governor was Gregory Zhatkovich, an American citizen who had earlier emigrated from the region and represented the Rusyn community in the U.S. Zhatkovich was appointed governor by Czechoslovakia's first president, T. G. Masaryk in 1920, and served for about one year until he resigned over differences regarding the region's autonomy. In 1928, it adopted the name of Subcarpathian Rus'. Nevertheless, such autonomy was granted as late as in 1938, after detrimental events of the Munich Conference; until then this land was administered directly from Prague by the government-appointed provincial presidents and/or elected governors.

Following the Munich Agreement, the southern part of the region was awarded to Hungary under the First Vienna Award in 1938. The remaining portion was constituted as an autonomous region of the short-lived Second Czechoslovak Republic.  After the Slovak declaration of an independent state on 14 March, the next day Carpatho-Ukraine was proclaimed as an independent Republic but was immediately occupied and annexed by Hungary, while the next day the Protectorate of Bohemia and Moravia was proclaimed. Voloshyn asked support for recognition in advance from Hitler, but received no answer. The state is known as 'the one-day republic' because it did not exist more than one day. The military operations and the occupation of Carpatho-Ukraine was finished by the Hungarian troops on March 18.

The Hungarian invasion was followed by a few weeks of terror in which more than 27,000 people were shot dead without trial and investigation. Over 75,000 Ukrainians decided to seek asylum in the Soviet Union; of those almost 60,000 died in Gulag prison-camps. Others joined the Czechoslovak Army.

The major Jewish communities of the region had existed in Mukachevo, Ungvar, and Khust. During the German occupation of Hungary (March–December 1944) almost the entire Jewish population was deported; few survived the Holocaust.

In October 1944 the region was occupied by the Red Army. On 26 November 1944 in Mukachevo took place the First Congress of People's Committees of Zakarpattia Ukraine, elections to which took place on November 10–25, 1944. On June 29, 1945, Czechoslovak President Edvard Beneš signed a treaty formally ceding the area and the next month it was united with the Ukrainian SSR through the "Manifest for unification with Soviet Ukraine" that was accepted by the 1st Congress of People's Committees of Sub-Carpathian Ukraine without any knowledge of common people. It was then annexed into the Ukrainian SSR as Zakarpattia Oblast.

Zakarpattia in Soviet Ukraine 
Between 1945 and 1947, the new Soviet authorities fortified the new borders, and in July 1947 declared Transcarpathia as "restricted zone of the highest level", with checkpoints on the mountain passes connecting the region to mainland Ukraine.

In December 1944 the National Council of Transcarpatho-Ukraine set up a special people's tribunal in Uzhgorod to try and condemn all collaborationists with the previous regimes – both Hungary and Carpatho-Ukraine. The court was allowed to hand down either 10 years of forced labour, or death penalty. Several Ruthenian leaders, including Andrej Bródy and Shtefan Fentsyk, were condemned and executed in May 1946. Avgustyn Voloshyn also died in prison. The extent of the repression showed to many Carpatho-Ruthenian activists that it was not possible to find an accommodation with the coming Soviet regime as it had been with all previous ones.

After breaking the Greek Catholic Church in Eastern Galicia in 1946, Soviet authorities pushed for the return to Orthodoxy of Greek-Catholic parishes in Transcarpathia too, including by engineering the accident and death of recalcitrant bishop Theodore Romzha on 1 November 1947. In January 1949 the Greek Catholic Eparchy of Mukachevo was declared illegal; remaining priests and nuns were arrested, and church properties were nationalised and parcelled for public use or lent to the Russian Orthodox Church (Moscow Patriarchate) as only accepted religious authority in the region.

Cultural institutions were also forbidden, including the russophile Dukhnovych Society, the ukrainophile Prosvita, and the Subcarpathian Scholarly Society. New books and publications were circulated, including the Zakarpatska Pravda (130,000 copies). The Uzhhorod National University was opened in 1945. Over 816 cinemas were open by 1967 to insure the indoctrination of the population to Marxism–Leninism.  The Ukrainian language was the first language of instruction in schools throughout the region, followed by Russian, which was used at the university. Most new generations had a passive knowledge of Rusyn language, but no knowledge about local culture. XIX-century Rusyn intellectuals were labelled as "members of the reactionary class and instruments of Vatican obscurantism". The Rusyn anthem and hymn were banned from public performance. Carpatho-Rusyn folk culture and songs, which were promoted, were presented as part of Transcarpathian regional culture as a local variant of Ukrainian culture.

As early as 1924, the Comintern had declared all East Slavic inhabitants of Czechoslovakia (Rusyns, Carpatho-Russians, Rusnaks) to be Ukrainians. As the 1946 census, all Rusyns were recorded as Ukrainians; anyone clinging to the old label was considered a separatist and a potential counter-revolutionary.

Already in February 1945, the National Council proceeded to confiscate 53,000 hectares of land from big landowners and redistribute it to 54,000 peasant households (37% of the population). Forced collectivisation of land started in 1946; around 2,000 peasants were arrested during protests in 1948–49 and sent for forced labour in the gulags. Collectivisation, including of mountain shepherds, was completed by May 1950. Central planning decisions set Transcarpathia to become a "land of orchards and vineyards" between 1955 and 1965, planting 98,000 hectares with little results. Attempt to cultivate tea and citrus also failed due to climate. Most vineyards were uprooted twenty years later, during Gorbachev's anti-alcohol campaign in 1985–87.

The Soviet period also meant the upscaling of industrialisation in Transcarpathia. State-owned lumber mills, chemical and food-processing plants widened, with Mukachevo's tobacco factory and Solotvyno's salt works as the biggest ones, providing steady employment to the residents of the region, beyond the traditional subsistence agriculture. And while traditional labour migration routes to the fields of Hungary or the factories of the Nort-West United States were now closed, Carpathian Ruthens and Romanians could now move for seasonal work in Russia's North and East.

The inhabitants of the oblast grew steadily in the Soviet period, from 776,000 in 1946 to over 1,2 million in 1989. Uzhgorod increased its residents five-fold, from 26,000 to 117,000, and Mukachevo likewise from 26,600 to 84,000. This population increase also reflected demographic changes. The arrival of the Red Army meant the departure of 5,100 Magyars and 2,500 Germans, while the 15–20,000 Jews survivors of the Holocaust also decided to move out before the borders were sealed. By 1945, around 30,000 Hungarians and Germans had been interned and sent for labour camps in Eastern Ukraine and Siberia; while amnestied in 1955, around 5,000 did not come back. In January 1946, 2,000 more Germans were deported. In return, a large number of Ukrainians and Russians moved to Transcarpathia, where they found jobs in the industry, the military, or the civilian administration. By 1989, around 170,000 Ukrainians (mainly from nearby Galizia) and 49,000 Russians were living in Transcarpathia, mainly in new residential blocks in the main towns of Uzhgorod and Mukachevo, where the dominant language had soon turned from Hungarian and Yiddish to Russian. They kept being considered newcomers (novoprybuli) due to their disconnect from the Rusyn- and Hungarian-speaking countryside.

Zakarpattia in independent Ukraine 
After the fall of the Soviet Union in 1991, Ukraine held an independence referendum in which the residents of Zakarpattia were asked about the Zakarpattia Oblast Council's proposal for self-rule. About 78% of the oblast's population voted in favour of autonomy; however, it was not granted.

At the first Presidential elections in Ukraine in 1991, voters from Transcarpathia supported  Leonid Kravchuk by 58%.
At the 1994 Ukrainian parliamentary election, Transcarpathia elected 9 independent MPs over 11 to the Rada. The same year, voters in the region supported the incumbent Leonid Kravchuk over Leonid Kuchma by 70.5%
At the 1998 Ukrainian parliamentary election, Transcarpathia turned out to be one of the strongholds (together with Kyiv and L'viv) of Viktor Medvedchuk's Social Democratic Party of Ukraine (united), which back then ran on a moderate Ukrainian nationalist ideology.
One year later, at the Presidential elections, Transcarpathian voters supported the re-election of Leonid Kuchma by 85%.

At the 2002 Ukrainian parliamentary election, voters from Transcapathia supported the Our Ukraine Bloc, in line with voters from all Western Ukraine. 
At the 2004 Ukrainian presidential election, Transcarpathians voted in majority for Viktor Yushchenko.
At the 2006 Ukrainian parliamentary election, voters from Transcapathia supported the Our Ukraine Bloc and the Yulia Tymoshenko Bloc, in line with voters in Ciscarpatian East Galizia.
At the 2007 Ukrainian parliamentary election, the Our Ukraine–People's Self-Defense Bloc linked with former President Viktor Yushchenko won in most of the region, while the Yulia Tymoshenko Bloc came out first in Uzhgorod and its raion.

On 7 March 2007, the Zakarpattia Oblast Council recognized the Rusyn ethnicity.

On October 25, 2008, 100 delegates to the Congress of Carpathian Ruthenians declared the formation of the "Republic of Carpathian Ruthenia". The prosecutor's office of Zakarpattia region has filed a case against priest Dymytrii Sydor and Yevhen Zhupan (members of the Russian Orthodox Church in Ukraine and in close relations with the Russkiy Mir Foundation), an Our Ukraine deputy of the Zakarpattia regional council and chairman of the People's Council of Ruthenians, on charges of encroaching on the territorial integrity and inviolability of Ukraine. On May 1, 2009, National Union Svoboda blocked the holding of the third European congress of the Carpathian Ruthenians (a pro-Russian entity).

At the 2010 Ukrainian presidential election, Yulia Tymoshenko won in most raion of Transcarpathia save for Mukachevo, Berehove and Vynohradiv, where Viktor Yanukovych gained a majority.

In the 2010 and 2015 local elections, the United Centre won majorities in Transcarpathia.
The 2012 Ukrainian parliamentary election saw both the United Centre and the Party of Regions win districts in Transcarpathia.

In the 2014 presidential election, Transparthia helped elect Petro Poroshenko as president of Ukraine. Turnout in the east of the region was among the lowest in Ukraine, below 40%, while it reached 65% in its west.
At the 2014 Ukrainian parliamentary election, electoral results in Transcarpathia saw districts being won by Arseniy Yatsenyuk's People's Front and by the Petro Poroshenko Bloc.

Ukraine's 2017 education law makes Ukrainian the required language of study in state schools. Since 2017, the Hungary–Ukraine relations rapidly deteriorated over the issue of the Hungarian minority in Ukraine.

Transcaparthian voters supported Volodymyr Zelensky as new President of Ukraine at the 2019 elections.

At the 2019 Ukrainian parliamentary election, President Volodymyr Zelensky's Servant of the People won a plurality in Transcarpathia too. Electoral turnout in the region was the lowest in the country (<42.5%)

Politics

Zakarpattia Oblast's local administration is controlled by the Zakarpattia Oblast Council (rada).

The oblast's governor (since July 2015 Hennadiy Moskal) is appointed by the President of Ukraine.

2020
Distribution of seats after the 2020 Ukrainian local elections

Election date was 25 October 2020

2015
Distribution of seats after the 2015 Ukrainian local elections

Election date was 25 October 2015

Administrative divisions

On 18 July 2020, the number of raions (districts) was reduced to six.

Zakarpattia Oblast was previously subdivided into 13 raions (districts), as well as 5 cities (municipalities) which are directly subordinate to the oblast government: Berehove, Chop, Khust, Mukachevo, and the administrative centre of the oblast, Uzhhorod. There are a total of 7 cities, 19 towns, and more than 579 villages.

Zakarpattia Oblast incorporates four unofficial geographic-historic regions (counties): Ung, Bereg, Ugocsa and Northern Maramureș. There is a project for a reform of the current administrative division of the Oblast

The oblast (region) was divided into 13 raions and five cities of regional importance including the administrative centre Uzhhorod. Administrative centres of raions may be located within a city of regional importance, while such city is not technically a part of the raion. A city of regional significance may consist of an individual populated place or be complex of several settlements (the city proper and suburbs) which are governed by own radas (councils).

Further, each raion is divided into radas (councils). Cities and towns (urban-type settlements) all have own individual councils, while villages and rural settlements may be formed into multiple settlements councils or an individual village council. All cities are either of regional importance or of district importance.

Raions after 2020
 Berehove (Берегівський район), the center is in the town of Berehove
 Khust (Хустський район), the center is in the town of Khust
 Mukachevo (Мукачівський район), the center is in the town of Mukachevo
 Rakhiv (Рахівський район), the center is in the town of Rakhiv
 Tiachiv (Тячівський район), the center is in the town of Tiachiv
 Uzhhorod (Ужгородський район), the center is in the city of Uzhhorod

Raions before 2020
There were 13 raions (districts) in the oblast until 2020:

Urban settlements
* regional municipalities

Cities of regional significance

 Uzhhorod (116,400)
 Mukachevo (93,738)
 Khust (31,083)
 Berehove (Beregszász) (24,274)
 Chop (Csap) (8,436)

Other urban settlements

Demographics

According to the 2001 Ukrainian Census, the population of Zakarpattia Oblast is 1,254,614. With the comparison of the last official Soviet Census of 1989 the total population grew by 0.7%.

Ukrainians and the 2001 Ukrainian Census, does not recognise ethnic Rusyns as a separate nationality, instead categorizing them as a subgroup of Ukrainians. Rusyns and the Rusyn language are thus included in the category of Ukrainians and Ukrainian language group are in the majority (80.5%), other ethnic groups are relatively numerous in Zakarpattia. The largest of these are Hungarians (12.1%), Romanians (2.6%), Russians (2.5%), Roma (1.1%), Slovaks (0.5%) and Germans (0.3%). The Ukrainian government does not recognize the Rusyn people living in that country as a distinct nationality but rather as an ethnic sub-group of Ukrainians. About 10,100 people (0.8%) identify themselves as Rusyns according to the last census.

Out of 1,010,100 Ukrainians in the region, 99.2% (~1,002,019) identified their native language as Ukrainian, while about 0.5% (~5,051) consider their native language to be Russian. Out of 151,500 Hungarians, 97.1% (~147,107) consider their native language to be Hungarian, while about 2.6% (~3,939) consider their native language to be Ukrainian. Out of the 32,100 officially recorded Romanians, 99.1% (31,811) identified their native language to be Romanian, while 0.6% (~193) consider their language Ukrainian. Out of 31,000 Russians, 91.6% (28,396) identified their native language as Russian, while 8.1% (~2,511) consider their language Ukrainian. Out of 14,000 Romani peoples only 20.7% (2,898) identify their native language as Romani, while 62.9% (~8,806) consider their language Ukrainian or Russian. Out of 5,600 Slovaks 43.9% (2,458) identify their native language as Slovak, while 42.1% (~2,358) consider their language Ukrainian. Out of 3,500 Germans, 50.0% (1,750) acknowledge their native language, while 38.9% (~1,362) consider their language Ukrainian. About 81% of the oblast population considers the Ukrainian language their native language, while 12.7% of population gives consideration to the Hungarian language and just over 5% considers either the Russian or Romanian languages.

Around two thirds are Eastern Orthodox and about a quarter are Catholic. The largest denomination is the Ukrainian Orthodox Church of the Kyivan Patriarchate, followed by the Ukrainian Orthodox Church of the Moscow Patriarchate and the Ruthenian Greek Catholic Church. Smaller religious groups include Roman Catholics and Protestants, which are largely associated with minority groups; Roman Catholics and Protestants tend to be Hungarian or local Ruthenian.

Their languages and culture are respected by the provision of education, clubs, etc. in their respective languages. Those who recognize Ukrainian as their native language total 81.0% of the population, Hungarian — 12.7%, Russian — 2.9%, Romanian — 2.6%, and Rusyn — 0.5% Residents in seven of Mukachivskyi Raion's villages have the option to learn the Hungarian language in a school or home school environment.

Zakarpattia is home to approximately 14,000 ethnic Roma (Gypsies), the highest proportion of Roma in any oblast in Ukraine. The first Hungarian College in Ukraine is in Berehovo, the II. Rákoczi Ferenc College.

Beside the major ethnic groups, Zakarpattia is home to several ethnic sub-groups such as Boykos, Lemky, Hutsuls, and others.

Religion

According to a 2021 survey, 31% of the religious community of Zakarpattia Oblast adheres to Catholicism, while 36% belong to the Eastern Orthodoxy and 20% are Protestants. Only one percent of the population does not follow any religion.

The Catholic community of Zakarpattia is divided as follows:

 Roman Catholic – 17%
 Greek Catholic – 83%

The Greek Catholic community falls under the Greek Catholic Eparchy of Mukachevo, associated with the Ruthenian Greek Catholic Church.

The Orthodox community of Zakarpattia is divided as follows:

 Ukrainian Orthodox Church of the Kyivan Patriarchate – 42%
 Ukrainian Orthodox Church of the Moscow Patriarchate – 33%
 Non-denominational – 25%
The Sub-Carpathian Reformed Church is considered to be the oldest Protestant community in Ukraine (the first group of Reformers appeared in Sub-Carpathia in the 1530s) and the only church of the Calvinist tradition.

Age structure
 0–14 years: 19.1%  (male 123,009/female 116,213)
 15–64 years: 69.8%  (male 428,295/female 445,417)
 65 years and over: 11.1%  (male 48,826/female 89,800) (2013 official)

Median age
 total: 35.1 years 
 male: 33.2 years 
 female: 37.1 years  (2013 official)

Economy

Situated in the Carpathian Mountains, Zakarpattia Oblast's economy depends mostly on trans-border trade, vinery and forestry. The oblast is also home to a special economic zone.

The oblast's main industry includes woodworking. Other industries include food, light industry, and mechanical engineering. The foodstuffs segment in the structure of ware production of national consumption is 45%. The total number of large industrial organisations is 319, compared to 733 small industrial organisations.

The most common crops grown within the region include cereals, potatoes and other vegetables. In 1999, the total amount of grain produced was 175,800 tons, of sunflower seeds — 1,300 tons, and potatoes — 378,200 tons. The region also produced 76,100 tons of meat, 363,400 tons of milk and 241,900,000 eggs. The total amount of registered farms in the region was 1,400 in 1999.

Culture

Wooden churches
Sredne Vodyane churches
Verkhnye Vodyane church
Danylovo church
Kolodne church
Krainykovo church
Nyzhnie Selyshche church
 church
Sokyrnytsia church
Huklyvyi church

Villages
 

Batrad
Halabor

See also
 Carpathian Ruthenia, small historical region
 Carpatho-Ukraine, a short-lived Ukrainian state on the territory
 Ruthenians and Ukrainians in Czechoslovakia
 Museum of Folk Architecture and Life, museum displaying Zakarpattia architecture
 Eparchy of Mukačevo and Prešov
Kárpátalja football team

Gallery

References

External links

 carpathia.gov.ua — Official website of Zakarpattia Oblast Administration 
 Zakarpattia Council official site  
 Zaholovok — Zakarpattia actual news
 Zakarpattia essays — All about Zakarpattia and Ukraine
 Verkhovna Rada website — Zakarpattia Oblast data
 Photos and infrastructure objects of Zakarpattia on interactive map (Ukrainian Navigational Portal)
 News from Zakarpattia 
 all.zakarpattya.net — All about Zakarpattia 
 mukachevo.net — Zakarpattia Oblast informational portal 
 map.meta.ua — Digital map of Zakarpattia Oblast 
 Zakarpattia Oblast – photographs 
 Dictionary of transcarpathian words 

 
Oblasts of Ukraine
States and territories established in 1946
1946 establishments in Ukraine
Rusyn communities